Anna Feodorovna Tiutcheva (3 May 1829 – 23 August 1889) was a Russian Empire courtier, slavophile and memoirist. She was the maid of honour and confidante of Empress Maria Alexandrovna (Marie of Hesse) from 1853 until 1866, and is known for her memoirs depicting Russian life from 1853 until 1882, which are regarded to be a valuable historic source of the life of Russian aristocracy in mid 19th-century Russia. She was the daughter of Fyodor Tyutchev and married Ivan Aksakov in 1866.

References

1829 births
1889 deaths
People from Munich
People from the Kingdom of Bavaria
Ladies-in-waiting from the Russian Empire
Memoirists from the Russian Empire
Slavophiles
Women memoirists
19th-century memoirists